Adeline Morrison Swain (1820-1899) was a writer, politician and suffragist. She was inducted into the Iowa Women's Hall of Fame in 2000.

Life
Swain née Morrison was born on May 25, 1820, in Bath, New Hampshire. After completing her education she took up teaching in Vermont at the age of 16.  In 1846 she married James Swain and the couple settled in Fort Dodge, Iowa, in 1858. In Fort Dodge she organized French, English, music, botany, and art classes specifically for young women. She went on to organize Fort Dodge's first women's suffrage meeting the following year.

In the early 1870s the couple built a large Victorian house in Fort Dodge. The house was grander than their income allowed and they rented out rooms to boarders and also made the house available for events. By 1879 they sold the house to Webb Vincent. In 1977 the Swain-Vincent House was listed on the National Register of Historic Places as the Vincent House.

Swain was appointed as a correspondent of the Entomological Commission of the U.S. Department of Agriculture which led her, in 1877, to write a report documenting the devastation of crops brought on by the Colorado grasshopper. She subsequently became a member of the American Association for the Advancement of Science and became the first woman to present a paper at their national convention.

Swain was active in politics where she was affiliated with the Greenback Party. In 1883 Swain ran for Iowa Superintendent of Public Instruction. Though she lost, she was the first woman to run for statewide public office in Iowa.

Swain died on February 3, 1899, in Illinois and was buried in Fort Dodge.

Legacy
Swain was included in the 1893 publication A Woman of the Century. She was memorialized in the "Annals of Iowa, Vol. 4, No. 1 (1899)" and was inducted into the Iowa Women's Hall of Fame in 2000.

See also
 List of suffragists and suffragettes

References

External links

1820 births
1899 deaths
American suffragists
People from Bath, New Hampshire
Activists from New Hampshire
People from Fort Dodge, Iowa
Activists from Iowa
Iowa Greenbacks
Women in Iowa politics
19th-century American politicians
19th-century American women politicians